A takhallus , is a pen-name. Pen names were widely adopted by Urdu, Punjabi, Hindi and Persian poets. 

Takhallus is an Arabic word which means, literally, "to get liberated" or "become secure;"  the word has been borrowed in Hindi-Urdu and Punjabi to mean "pen name".

The takhallus is often included in the maqta, last sher (couplet), of the ghazal.

History 
While ghazal originated in Arabia evolving from Qasida, some of the common features of contemporary ghazal, such as including the takhallus in the maqta, the concept of matla, etc., did not exist in Arabic ghazal. It was Persian ghazal which added these features.

Common Takhallus 
List of Takhallus of some Urdu poets:

 Ghalib – Mirza Asadullah Baig Khan
 Faiz – Faiz Ahmed Faiz
 Hali – Altaf Hussain Hali
 Jigar - Sikander Ali Moradabadi
 Kaki - Khwaja Qutbuddin Bakhtiar
 Zafar - Bahadur Shah II
 Mir - Mir Taqi Mir

List of Takhallus of some Persian poets:

 "Ilyas Qadri" (Attar)
 "Hafez"
 "Jami"
 "Khamushn" (Rumi)
 Rumi
for example:
baya janaan inayat kun, tu maulana-e-rumi ra
ghulam-e-shams tabrezam, qalandarwaar mi gardam
 'Sadi "Ashfaq Attari" (Fani Badayuni)''

See also
 List of Urdu-language poets
 Urdu poetry

References

External links 

Urdu-language poetry